The 2017–18 Albanian Women's National Championship was the 9th season of the Albanian Women's National Championship, the top Albanian women's league for association football clubs, since its establishment in 2009. The season started on 30 September 2017 and finished on 19 May 2018.

Vllaznia Shkodër secured their fifth league title on 28 April 2018 following an 0–11 victory over Bilisht Sport.

League table

Results

References

External links
Official website

Albanian Women's National Championship seasons
Alb
Women's National Championship